The 1989 European Karate Championships, the 24th edition, was held in Titograd, Yugoslavia from May 2 to 4, 1989.

Medallists

Men's competition

Individual

Team

Women's competition

Individual

Team

References

External links
 Karate Records - European Championship 1989

1989
International sports competitions hosted by Yugoslavia
European Karate Championship
European championships in 1989
Sports competitions in Podgorica
20th century in Podgorica
1989 in Montenegro
May 1989 sports events in Europe